Papa Winnie (birth name Winston Carlisle Peters) is a reggae musician from St. Vincent and the Grenadines in the Caribbean. As of 1997 he had sold over 200,000 albums in Latin America and Asia. He is famous in Italy following a 1989 performance of the song "You Are My Sunshine".

His recordings often make mention of Rootsie and Boopsie, first named in his song of the same title from 1987. In an interview on Italian TV, he said that "Rootsie" and "Boopsie" were nicknames for the two children he just had from his recently married Italian girlfriend, but he gave no further information about the children's real names.

In 1993, Papa Winnie visited Brazil but he had no band to play shows with him. He immediately picked four people: Nelson Meirelles, Marcelo Lobato, Alexandre Menezes and Marcelo Yuka as the band. After Papa Winnie's shows, the four decided to stay together picking Falcão as the fifth member and vocalist. (O Rappa)

In 1995, Papa Winnie recorded the Ray Charles classic "I Can't Stop Loving You" rated as one of the better visual videos of the year.

Discography

Releases:

April The Sweetest Girl (12") 	  	Epic 	1988

One Blood One Love (LP, Album) 	  	N.T.M. Records 	1989

One Blood One Love (LP, Album) 	  	Epic 	1989

Rootsie & Boopsie (LP) 	  	Epic 	1989

Rootsie & Boopsie (Single) ◄ (2 versions) 	  	Epic 	1989

Rootsie & Boopsie (7", Single) 	  	Epic 	1989

Rootsie & Boopsie (7", Single) 	  	Epic 	1989

Rootsie & Boopsie ◄ (2 versions) 	  	Epic 	1989

Rootsie & Boopsie (12") 	  	Epic 	1989

Rootsie & Boopsie (12") 	  	Epic 	1989

You Are My Sunshine (LP) 	  	BMG Ariola Discos 	1989

Get Up Disco Mix 12" (12") 	  	Epic 	1990

Please Stay (12") 	  	N.T.M. Records, Discomagic Records 	1993

Rootsie & Boopsie - You Are My Sunshine (Single) ◄ (4 versions) 	  	MCA Records 	1993

Rootsie & Boopsie - You Are My Sunshine (12") 	  	MCA Records 	1993

Rootsie & Boopsie - You Are My Sunshine (CD, Single) 	  	MCA Records 	1993

Rootsie & Boopsie - You Are My Sunshine (12") 	  	MCA Records 	1993

Rootsie & Boopsie - You Are My Sunshine - Dance Remixes (CD, Single) 	  	MCA Records 	1993

Someday, New Day (12") 	  	MCA Records 	1993

I Can't Stop Loving You (Maxi) ◄ (2 versions) 	  	MCA Music Entertainment GmbH	1994

I Can't Stop Loving You (12") 	  	MCA Music Entertainment GmbH 	1994

I Can't Stop Loving You (CD, Maxi) 	  	MCA Records 	1994

Appears On:

Da Ya Think I'm Secchi (Album) ◄ (6 versions) 	Come On Baby 	ZYX Records  	1991

Da Ya Think I'm Secchi (CD, Album) 	Come On Baby 	ZYX Records 	1991

Da Ya Think I'm Secchi (CD) 	Come On Baby 	Airplay Records 	1991

Da Ya Think I'm Secchi (CD) 	Come On Baby 	Epic 	1991

Da Ya Think I'm Secchi (LP, Album) 	Come On Baby 	Epic 	1991

Da Ya Think I'm Secchi (LP) 	Come On Baby 	ZYX Records 	1991

Da Ya Think I'm Secchi (CD, Album) 	Come On Baby 	Red Bullet 	1991

Bacardi Feeling (Remixes '97) (CD, Maxi) 	Bacardi Feeling (Radio... 	WEA Records (Germany) 	1997

It's My Life (Maxi) ◄ (6 versions) 	  	Yes Music ... 	1997

It's My Life (CD, Maxi) 	  	Yes Music 	1997

It's My Life (CD, Maxi) 	  	12INC 	1997

It's My Life (CD, Maxi) 	  	EAMS 	1997

It's My Life (12") 	  	EAMS 	1997

It's My Life (12") 	  	EMI Music (France) 	1997

It's My Life (12", Promo) 	  	Dancin' Music 	1998

Europop (Album) ◄ (5 versions) 	Living In A Bubble (Al... 	Logic Records ... 	1999

Europop (CD, Album) 	Living In A Bubble (Al... 	Logic Records 	1999

Europop (CD, Album) 	Living In A Bubble 	Popular Records 	1999

Europop (Cass, Album) 	Living In A Bubble (Al... 	BMG 	1999

Europop (CD, Album) 	Living In A Bubble (Al... 	BMG Russia 	1999

Europop (CD, Album) 	Livin' In A Bubble 	Hot Tracks (3) 	1999

Celebration (2xCD, Album, Ltd) 	I'll Be There (Single ... 	BMG Berlin Musik GmbH 	2002

DJ Selection 202: The House Jam Part 52 (CD, Comp) 	Send The Message (Matt... 	Do It Yourself Entertainment Strategic Marketing 	2008

DJ Zone 70 - Special Session 14 (2xCD, Comp) 	Send The Message (Matt... 	Time Records 	2008

Ohh LaLa / Send The Message (CD, Maxi, Promo) 	  	disco:wax 	2008

Send The Message (12") 	  	Move Rec. 	2008

Send The Message (CD, Maxi) 	  	Move Rec. 	2008

The 2009 Annual (2xCD, Mixed, Comp) 	Send The Message (Matt... 	Ministry Of Sound (Australia) 	2008

Summer Session 09 (CD, Comp, Mixed) 	Send The Message 	DKD D-Noy Muzik 	2009

Winter Jam 2009 (2xCD, Comp) 	Send The Message (Club... 	disco:wax 	2009

Tracks Appear On:

Festivalbar '89 (2xLP, Comp) 	Rootsie Bootsie / Take... 	RCA 	1989

Baby Hits 1 (LP, Comp) 	Rootsie & Boopsie 	COMA Records (DK) 	1990

Deejay Estate 90 (LP) 	Get Up 	EMI Records 	1990

Festivalbar '90 (2xLP, Comp) 	Brothers & Sister 	PolyGram Dischi SPA 	1990

Papillon 15 Anos (CD, Comp) 	Medley 	Epic 	1991

Christmas Party At Orbilux The Best Of...And More (Cass, Comp, Mixed) 	Rootsie & Boopsie 	Unison Records 	1992

Project Mix 2 (12", Comp, 33 ) 	Please Stay 	G.S.E. Records 	1992

Would? / Jeremy / Rootsie & Boopsie / Wishing On A Star (7") 	Rootsie & Boopsie 	Sony Music Entertainment (Brazil) 1992

Absolute Reggae 2 (Comp) ◄ (2 versions) 	Rootsie + Boopsie - Yo... 	EVA Records (Sweden) 	1993

Absolute Reggae 2 (CD) 	Rootsie + Boopsie - Yo... 	EVA Records (Sweden) 	1993

Absolute Reggae 2 (LP, Comp) 	Rootsie + Boopsie - Yo... 	EVA Records (Sweden) 	1993

Black & White Dynamite (CD) 	Rootsie & Boopsie (You... 	PolyGram 	1993

EAMS Compilation Volume 1 (CD, Comp) 	Rootsie & Boopsie 	EAMS 	1993

Formel Eins - Hits On Ice (2xCD, Comp) 	Someday, New Day 	Polystar Records 	1993

Super Dance 4 (Comp) ◄ (2 versions) 	Rootsie & Boopsie - Yo... 	ZYX Music 	1993

Super Dance 4 (2xCD) 	Rootsie & Boopsie - Yo... 	ZYX Music 	1993

Super Dance 4 (2xCass, Comp) 	Rootsie & Boopsie You ... 	ZYX Music 	1993

Dance It Again, Sam! Vol. 2 - The Flashback Remixes (CD, Comp) 	I Can't Stop Loving Yo... 	BMG Ariola Discos 	1994

One Shot Summer (CD) 	Rootsie & Boopsie (Med... 	Universal Music (Italy) 	2000

DJ Selection 53: Reggae Night Vol. 1 (CD, Comp) Rootsie & Boopsie Do It Yourself Entertainment Strategic Marketing 	2005

Booty Summer '07 (LP, Pic, Ltd) 	Push It 	Fon-Ky 	2007

One Shot 1989 (2xCD) 	Rootsie & Boopsie (Med... 	Universal Music (Italy), Universal Music (Italy) 	2007

Tropical Feeling (4xCD) 	Rootsie & Boopsie You ... 	Polymedia Marketing Group GmbH 	

Unofficial Releases:

Deep Dance 20 (CD, Comp, Mixed, Unofficial) 	You Are My Sunshine 	Deep Dance 	1993

Deep Dance 23 (CD, Mixed) 	You Are My Sunshine, S... 	Deep Dance 	1993

Deep 49 - Deep Summermix (CD, Comp, Mixed, Unofficial) 	All Of My Heart, World... 	Deep Dance 	1997

References

Living people
Year of birth missing (living people)
Saint Vincent and the Grenadines musicians
Reggae musicians